Raúl Baillères Chávez (Silao, Guanajuato, Mexico, 1895 – 1967) created a business empire in Mexico. He founded the Instituto Tecnológico Autónomo de México (ITAM) on 29 March 1946.

His son, Alberto Baillères, was at the time of his death the second richest man in Mexico, and ninth in Latin America, according to Forbes magazine.

External links
 Profile at the ITAM website

1895 births
1967 deaths
People from Guanajuato
20th-century Mexican businesspeople
University and college founders
Mexican people of French descent
Raul